Tridrepana is a genus of moths belonging to the subfamily Drepaninae.

Species
Tridrepana acuta Watson, 1957
Tridrepana adelpha Swinhoe, 1905
Tridrepana aequinota Watson, 1957
Tridrepana albonotata (Moore, 1879)
Tridrepana argentistriga Warren, 1896
Tridrepana arikana (Matsumura, 1921)
Tridrepana aurorina Bryk, 1943
Tridrepana bicuspidata Song, Xue & Han, 2011
Tridrepana bifurcata Chen, 1985
Tridrepana brunneilinea Holloway, 1998
Tridrepana cervina (Warren, 1922)
Tridrepana crocea (Leech, 1889)
Tridrepana examplata (Warren, 1922)
Tridrepana finita Watson, 1957
Tridrepana flava (Moore, 1879)
Tridrepana fulva (Hampson, [1893])
Tridrepana fulvata (Snellen, 1876)
Tridrepana hainana Chu & Wang, 1988
Tridrepana hypha Chu & Wang, 1988
Tridrepana lunulata (Butler, 1887)
Tridrepana maculosa Watson, 1957
Tridrepana marginata Watson, 1957
Tridrepana mediata (Warren, 1922)
Tridrepana melliflua (Warren, 1922)
Tridrepana microcrocea Gaede, 1914
Tridrepana obliquitaenia (Warren, 1922)
Tridrepana obscura Watson, 1957
Tridrepana olivacea (Warren, 1922)
Tridrepana postica (Moore, 1879)
Tridrepana rectifascia Watson, 1957
Tridrepana rubromarginata (Leech, 1898)
Tridrepana sadana (Moore, 1865)
Tridrepana septempunctata Warren, 1896
Tridrepana sera (Warren, 1896)
Tridrepana sigma Watson, 1957
Tridrepana spatulata Watson, 1957
Tridrepana subadelpha Song, Xue & Han, 2011
Tridrepana subtusmaculata Gaede, 1933
Tridrepana subunispina Song, Xue & Han, 2011
Tridrepana thermopasta (Hampson, 1914)
Tridrepana trialba Watson, 1957
Tridrepana unispina Watson, 1957

References

 

Drepaninae
Drepanidae genera